Graça Aranha is a municipality in the state of Maranhão, Brazil, founded in 1959.

Altitude: 192m.
Population: 6,261 inhabitants (2020)
Area: 271 km2
Demographic density: 16.82 inhabitants/km2
Postal code: 65785-000
Microregion: Presidente Dutra

References

Municipalities in Maranhão
Populated places established in 1959